Freedom to Roam is Nikola Šarčević's fourth solo album, released in March 2013. The album was recorded entirely in English, as opposed to his previous solo album Nikola & Fattiglapparna, which was made up of all-Swedish lyrics.

On March 17, 2013, the first single and video clip for "Ophelia" was released.

The album is also set to be released on limited edition red or black vinyl. The release has since been delayed.

Track listing 
Ophelia
Drunk no more
Loved you before
Into the arms of a stranger
In love with a fool
Here and now
Free man
Still loving you
Which way to go
The Final Chapter

References

External links
Nikola Sarcevic Official Website - Discography

2013 albums